Conostylis serrulata, is a flowering plant in the family Haemodoraceae and is endemic to the south-west of Western Australia. It is a small perennial with yellow cream flowers and flat, green leaves.

Description
It usually has small, stiff, straight branches arising from the base. Flowering occurs in late winter, September or October.

Taxonomy and naming
Conostylis serrulata was first formally described in 1810 by Robert Brown and the description was published in Prodromus Florae Novae Hollandiae et Insulae Van Diemen.The specific epithet (serrulata) is in reference to the "finely serrate" leaves.

Distribution and habitat
This conostylis grows in laterite gravel on the south coast of Western Australia.

References

serrulata
Commelinales of Australia
Angiosperms of Western Australia
Plants described in 1810
Taxa named by Robert Brown (botanist, born 1773)